John Wereat (January 25, 1799) was an American politician and the Governor of Georgia.

Personal life
Wereat was born in Road (now Rode, Somerset) in England, around 1733 and migrated to the colonies in 1759. He married the former Hannah Wilkinson. They arrived in Savannah in 1759, where John partnered with William Handley, who was related to Hannah.

Political life
John Wereat was appointed to the Council of Georgia on April 14, 1766. In the early years of the American Revolution, Wereat was a member of the Provincial Congress and the Council of Safety. From 1776 through the end of the war, he served as Georgia's Continental agent, representing the state in dealings with Congress. Wereat was a delegate for Georgia in the Continental Congress and Governor of Georgia in 1779. During his term as governor, he fought against the Yazoo land fraud, organizing the Georgia Union Company in an attempt to buy western lands and prevent them from inclusion in the Yazoo sales. The Yazoo land fraud left a stain on Georgia politics for years, finally being resolved under the governorship of James Jackson.

Wereat spent a year as a prisoner of the British in Charleston, South Carolina after initially being taken captive in Augusta in 1780.

After his gubernatorial term, Wereat served as state auditor from 1782 until 1793. In December 1787 he presided over the state convention that unanimously ratified the new Federal Constitution.

John Wereat was in the Whig party along with John Martin and Lyman Hall.

Death and legacy
John Wereat died at his Bryan County, Georgia plantation on January 25, 1799.

See also
 List of U.S. state governors born outside the United States

References

New Georgia Encyclopedia entry for John Wereat

1799 deaths
Governors of Georgia (U.S. state)
People from Mendip District
18th-century American Episcopalians
English emigrants to the United States
Independent state governors of the United States
Year of birth unknown
Georgia (U.S. state) Whigs
19th-century American politicians
Georgia (U.S. state) Independents
American Revolutionary War prisoners of war held by Great Britain
1733 births